Arthur James Arnot (26 August 1865 – 15 October 1946) was a Scottish electrical engineer and inventor, best known for patenting the world's first electric drill. He later designed the Spencer Street Power Station.

Biography 
Arnot was born in Hamilton, Scotland to William and Elizabeth Helen Arnot. He received his education at the West of Scotland Technical College, Glasgow, while working part-time at an electrical company. In 1889 he traveled to Melbourne, Australia to build the alternating current power plant at Spencer Street. The same year, on 20 August, he patented the electric drill. Originally on a two-year contract by Union Electric Company, Arnot was appointed City Electrical Engineer in 1891. During the first two years of this tenure he was responsible for the installation of the city's street lighting system. In the years 1894–1901, he designed and later managed the Spencer Street Power Station. From 1901 to 1929 Arnot held the position of Australasian Manager of Babcock & Wilcox.

In 1928, one year before his retirement, Arnot became involved in a corruption scandal over a May 1926 contract acquired by Babcock & Wilcox. The investigation revealed that alderman S. J. Maling had demanded a £10,000 bribe. Arnot, who had represented Babcock & Wilcox in the negotiations, was admonished, and the company was fined. Maling received a six-month prison sentence.

Personal life 

Arnot married Cornelia Ann, daughter of former mayor Cornelius Job Ham, in August 1889. They had four children. He later married Dora Christine, née Shewan, with whom he had two children Wendy Barbara and David Macdonald. In his later years, Arnot acquired a farm in Batlow, New South Wales. He is described as a "keen fisherman", and was also a member of the Royal Sydney Golf Club.

References

Australian electrical engineers
19th-century Australian inventors
19th-century Scottish inventors
People from Hamilton, South Lanarkshire
Scottish emigrants to colonial Australia
1865 births
1946 deaths
Scottish electrical engineers
Alumni of the University of Strathclyde